Highgrove may refer to:

Australia 
 Highgrove, Queensland, a locality in the Toowoomba Region

United Kingdom 
 Highgrove House and estate, a royal residence in Gloucestershire
 Highgrove House, Eastcote, a Grade II listed mansion in Eastcote, within the London Borough of Hillingdon

United States 
 Highgrove, California, a US settlement
 Highgrove, Stamford, a residential apartment block in Connecticut